Guy Degrenne (3 August 1925 – 7 November 2006) was a French businessman who specialised in cutlery and silverware. He has founded the Guy Degrenne group, since 1987 a subsidiary of holding 'Table de France'.

Biography
Guy Degrenne was born in Tinchebray (Orne). He attended Collège Saint-Joseph in Caen, then studied at ESSEC Business School, and took up his father's steel factory (at Sourdeval) in 1948.

Guy Degrenne first has war-left steel parts collected, and turns them in stainless steel dishes, with instant commercial success. By 1958, Guy Degrenne sets up a tableware business, then by 1963 ushers in the luxury tableware business, in copying the standards of Parisian goldsmiths.

In 1967, part of the production is moved to a new factory in Vire (Calvados). His business then employs about 600 workers.
In 1978, Degrenne meets national recognition with a popular advert reminiscent of his school years : a headmaster catches young Degrenne drawing dishes in his notebooks margin, and then warns him against ill-success (Ce n'est pas comme cela que vous réussirez dans la vie).

References

1925 births
2006 deaths
20th-century French businesspeople
People from Orne
Kitchen knife brands
ESSEC Business School alumni
French industrialists